

Preliminary round
Preliminary round consists of 24 teams, split in 6 groups of 4 teams. Round is played in round-robin format. Winners of each groups qualify for Qualifying round, where are joined by 18 best ranked teams.

Group A

Group B

Group C

Group D

Group E

Group F

Qualifying round
Preliminary round consists of 24 teams, split in 6 groups of 4 teams. Round is played in round-robin format. Group winners qualify for Qualifying round, where are joined by 18 best ranked teams.
Qualifying round consists of 24 teams, split in 6 groups of 4 teams. Round is played in one way round-robin format. Tournament hosts are Azerbaijan, Netherlands, Poland, Romania, Ukraine and Slovenia. Six group winners and best five second-placed teams qualify for Finals, held in Croatia in February 2012. Croatia already qualified as host.

Group 1

TH Title Holder

Group 2

Group 3

Group 4

Group 5

Group 6

External links

 Official UEFA website

Q
2012
Uefa
Uefa